The beach volleyball tournament at the 2018 Mediterranean Games in Tarragona took place between 28 and 30 June at the Arrabassada Beach Stadium.

Medal table

Medalists

References

External links
2018 Mediterranean Games – Beach volleyball

Sports at the 2018 Mediterranean Games
2018
Mediterranean Games